The enzyme arabinonate dehydratase catalyzes the chemical reaction

D-arabinonate  2-dehydro-3-deoxy-D-arabinonate + H2O

This enzyme belongs to the family of lyases, specifically the hydro-lyases, which cleave carbon-oxygen bonds.  The systematic name of this enzyme class is D-arabinonate hydro-lyase (2-dehydro-3-deoxy-D-arabinonate-forming). This enzyme is also called D-arabinonate hydro-lyase.

References

 

EC 4.2.1
Enzymes of unknown structure